Phichit Football Club is a Thai semi-professional football club based in Phichit Province. They currently withdrew to play in Thai League 3 Northern Region.

Timeline
History of events of Phichit Football Club

Honours

Domestic Leagues
Regional League Central Division:
Winners : 2016 (as name Ayutthaya Warrior)

Regional League Northern Division
 Runner-Up (2) : 2009, 2014

Stadium and locations

Season By Season Record

External links
 Official Website of Phichit FC
 Official Facebookpage of Phichit FC

Football clubs in Thailand
Association football clubs established in 2009
Sport in Phichit province
2009 establishments in Thailand